Taniko Nakamura-Mitsukuri (中村-三栗 多仁子, born March 23, 1943) is a retired Japanese gymnast. She competed in all artistic gymnastics events at the 1964 and 1968 Olympics and won a team bronze medal in 1964 + bronze at the asymmetric bar during the 1966 World Artistic Gymnastics Championships. Her best individual achievement was seventh place on uneven bars in 1968. Born Taniko Nakamura she changed her last name after marrying Takashi Mitsukuri, a fellow Olympic gymnast.

References

1943 births
Living people
Japanese female artistic gymnasts
Olympic gymnasts of Japan
Gymnasts at the 1964 Summer Olympics
Gymnasts at the 1968 Summer Olympics
Olympic bronze medalists for Japan
Olympic medalists in gymnastics
Medalists at the 1964 Summer Olympics
Medalists at the World Artistic Gymnastics Championships